The 8th Mieczysław Połukard Criterium of Polish Speedway League Aces was the 1989 version of the Mieczysław Połukard Criterium of Polish Speedway Leagues Aces. It took place on March 19 in the Polonia Stadium in Bydgoszcz, Poland.

Starting positions draw 

 Jacek Gomólski - Polonia Bydgoszcz
 Wojciech Żabiałowicz - Apator Toruń
 Roman Jankowski - Unia Leszno
 Zenon Kasprzak - Unia Leszno
 Jacek Woźniak - Polonia Bydgoszcz
 Zdzisław Rutecki - Polonia Bydgoszcz
 Mirosław Korbel - ROW Rybnik
 Ryszard Franczyszyn - Stal Gorzów Wlkp.
 Janusz Stachyra - Stal Rzeszów
 Andrzej Huszcza - Falubaz Zielona Góra
 Krzysztof Okupski - Stal Gorzów Wlkp.
 Wojciech Załuski - Kolejarz Opole
 Stanisław Miedziński - Apator Toruń
 Waldemar Cieślewicz - Polonia Bydgoszcz
 Janusz Kapustka - Unia Tarnów
 Sławomir Drabik - Włókniarz Częstochowa
 (R1) Zbigniew Bizoń - Polonia Bydgoszcz
 (R2) Krzysztof Ziarnik - Polonia Bydgoszcz

Heat details

Sources 
 Roman Lach - Polish Speedway Almanac

See also 

Mieczyslaw Polukard
Mieczyslaw Polukard
Mieczysław Połukard Criterium of Polish Speedway Leagues Aces